USS Tollberg (APD-103) was a United States Navy high-speed transport in commission from 1945 to 1946. In 1965, Tollberg was transferred to Colombia and served as ARC Almirante Padilla (DT-03) until being stricken and scrapped in 1973.

Namesake
Maynard W. Tollberg was born on 17 February 1904 born at North Branch, Minnesota. He enlisted in the United States Naval Reserve on September 24, 1923, and was honorably discharged on 15 September 1927. After the beginning of World War II, he reenlisted on 23 June 1942 with the same rating. He was assigned duty on board the destroyer .

On the afternoon of 30 January 1943, during the second day of the Battle of Rennell Island, La Vallette was screening the damaged heavy cruiser  when 11 Japanese torpedo planes attacked. La Vallette received a torpedo hit in her forward engine room which killed 22 members of the crew. Watertender Second Class Tollberg, although fatally scalded by high-temperature steam, climbed up the fire room ladder and emerged on the main deck through a hatch which had been blown open by the detonation. Despite severe pain and partial blindness, he died trying to close the control valve through which fuel oil was pouring into the fireroom below, where a number of his helpless shipmates were trapped. He then collapsed and soon died of his wounds. He was posthumously awarded the Navy Cross.

History

Construction and commissioning
Tollberg was laid down as the  USS Tollberg (DE-593) on 30 December 1943 by Bethlehem-Hingham Shipyard, Inc., at Hingham, Massachusetts, and was launched on 12 February 1944, sponsored by Mrs. Maynard W. Tollberg. After conversion to her new role, she was commissioned on 31 January 1945.

Pacific War
Tollberg stood out of Boston, Massachusetts, on 18 February 1945 for shakedown training off Bermuda. She left Bermuda on 9 March and arrived at Hampton Roads, Virginia, on 11 March.

On 25 March, Tollberg got underway to escort attack cargo ship  to the Panama Canal Zone. Tollberg transited the Panama Canal on 31 March and on 1 April proceeded independently to California. She reached San Diego, California, on 9 April and, on 15 April, departed for Hawaii.

Tollberg arrived at Pearl Harbor, Territory of Hawaii, on 22 April, but left again on 4 May and proceeded via Eniwetok to Ulithi Atoll. She arrived at the Hagushi beach area on 4 June and was assigned to picket duty in the antiaircraft and antisubmarine screen. Tollberg had only one opportunity to fire her guns at the enemy, at a distant Japanese aircraft.

On 9 August, Tollberg rescued a pilot from California whose float plane had swamped while taxiing in to be picked up. The warships arrived at Leyte in the Philippines on 11 August, and Tollberg remained there until 20 August. World War II ended during her stay at Leyte with the surrender of Japan on 15 August.

Postwar

Tollberg departed the Philippines on 20 August to escort a convoy to Okinawa and returned to Leyte on 29 August. Between 20 September and 3 October, she escorted Transport Squadron 14 to Wakayama Bay, Japan, and back to Leyte. On 2 November, she left Manila, Luzon, to carry passengers to Okinawa and, after escorting amphibious force command ship  to Shanghai, China, disembarked them at Buckner Bay, Okinawa, on 7 November. On 12 November, she was back at Manila. Between 24 and 26 November, she embarked 156 passengers at Samar in the Philippines for passage to the United States East Coast.

Departing Samar on 27 November, Tollberg called at Eniwetok, Pearl Harbor, San Diego, and the Panama Canal Zone before arriving at Norfolk, Virginia, on 30 December. She remained at Norfolk until 26 March 1946, when she headed for the West Indies. After two months in the Caribbean, she was at the New York Naval Shipyard in Brooklyn, New York, from 20 May to 24 July. She then entered the Charleston Naval Shipyard at Charleston, South Carolina, for preservation work which continued from 26 July to 12 November. Tollberg then moved on to Green Cove Springs, Florida, arriving there on 13 November.

Decommissioning and disposal
Tollberg was decommissioned at Green Cove Springs on 20 December 1946 and entered the Atlantic Reserve Fleet on the St. Johns River there. In September 1959, she was towed from Mayport, Florida, to Sabine Pass, Texas, and laid up with the Texas Reserve Group of the Atlantic Reserve Fleet.

Tollberg was stricken from the Navy List in November 1964

Colombian Navy service
Tollberg was transferred to Colombia under the Military Assistance Program on 14 August 1965. She served in the Colombian Navy as ARC Almirante Padilla (DT-03) until stricken and scrapped in 1973.

Honors and awards
Tollberg received one battle star for her World War II service.

References

NavSource Online: Amphibious Photo Archive USS Tollberg (APD-103)

Crosley-class high speed transports
Ships built in Hingham, Massachusetts
1944 ships
World War II frigates and destroyer escorts of the United States
World War II amphibious warfare vessels of the United States
Cold War amphibious warfare vessels of the United States
Crosley-class high speed transports of the Colombian Navy